Ajit Andhare (born on 11 July) is an Indian business leader, entrepreneur, currently chief operating officer at Viacom18 Studios.

Career

Ajit currently serves as the chief operating officer at Viacom 18 Motion Pictures (VMP), the motion pictures business of Viacom 18 Media Pvt Ltd.

Early life and education
A mechanical engineer from National Institute of Technology Rourkela & an alumnus of Indian School of Business has worked at HUL & BBLIL, Brooke Bond Lipton, Hindustan Lever & founded Raghav Bhal’s Capital18 funded Colosceum Media

He is known for producing television programs such as MTV Roadies, MTV Splitsvilla, Jai Shri Krishna for Colors, Wheel Smart Shrimati for Unilever and the Master Chef India series for Star India.

References

Living people
Year of birth missing (living people)
Place of birth missing (living people)
Indian chief operating officers